Garram the Hunter: A Boy of the Hill Tribes is a children's novel by Herbert Best. Illustrated by Erick Berry, the novel was first published in 1930 and was a Newbery Honor recipient in 1931.

The main character, Garram, is the son of a tribal chief in the Nigerian hills. When danger threatens, he is advised by the rainmaker to leave for the good of the tribe. With his faithful hunting dog, he travels to Yelwa, where he saves the life of the Emir and becomes Captain of the Guard.

References

1930 American novels
American children's novels
Newbery Honor-winning works
Novels set in Nigeria
1930 children's books